HD 33875 (HR 1700) is a solitary star in the southern circumpolar constellation Mensa. With an apparent magnitude of 6.26, it is barely visible to the naked eye under ideal conditions.

HD 33875 is an ordinary A-type main-sequence star with a stellar classification of either A1 V or A0 V depending on the source. At present it has 2.38 times the mass of the Sun and 2.84 times the radius of the Sun. It shines at 49.2 times the Sun's luminosity from its photosphere at an effective temperature of 9,392 K, which gives it a white glow.

References

Mensa (constellation)
A-type main-sequence stars
Mensae, 20
Durchmusterung objects
033875
023737
1700